Gekido Advance: Kintaro's Revenge is a beat 'em up game for the Game Boy Advance, created by Italian studio NAPS Team. It is a sequel to the PlayStation game Gekido. Unlike the previous installment, this game centers on one protagonist, instead of multiple characters as seen in Gekido. A version for N-Gage was planned but never released. 

In 2018, Gekido: Kintaro's Revenge was re-released for the Nintendo Switch, PlayStation 4, Xbox One, and Microsoft Windows.

Plot
The game focuses on Tetsuo, who has returned to his sensei's house only to be dispatched to a remote farming village where it seems as if the dead rise from the grave. Upon further investigation, Tetsuo finds out that the village has been having strange happenings ever since the old temple became overrun with demons. When he returns to the village after talking to the old guardian of the Temple, the village has been attacked, supposedly, as one of the dying villagers says, by "...ravens..." Also, it seems as if all the children have vanished as well.

Reception

The game received "average" reviews according to the review aggregation website Metacritic.

See also
List of beat 'em ups

References

External links
 

2002 video games
Beat 'em ups
Cancelled N-Gage games
Destination Software games
Game Boy Advance games
Nintendo Switch games
PlayStation 4 games
Video game sequels
Video games developed in Italy
Xbox One games
Windows games
Single-player video games
NAPS team games